Derek Jerome Hill (born December 30, 1995) is an American professional baseball center fielder in the Washington Nationals organization. Hill was drafted by the Detroit Tigers in the first round of the 2014 MLB draft, and he made his MLB debut in 2020.

Early life
Hill grew up in Des Moines, Iowa with his mother and spent his summers with his father in Northern California, where he played baseball for select teams. In 2011, he moved to Sacramento and attended Elk Grove High School in Elk Grove, California. He batted an even .500 (47-for-94) in his senior season, with 11 doubles, seven triples 30 runs batted in (RBI) and 29 stolen bases.

Professional career

Detroit Tigers
Hill was drafted by the Detroit Tigers in the first round, 23rd overall, in the 2014 Major League Baseball Draft. On June 11, the Tigers announced they agreed to terms on a deal with Hill that includes a $2 million signing bonus. He was previously committed to play college baseball at the University of Oregon. Hill spent 2014 with both the GCL Tigers and the Connecticut Tigers, posting a combined .208 batting average with two home runs and 14 RBIs in 47 games between both teams. Hill's 2015 season, in which he batted .238 with a .619 OPS and 25 stolen bases while playing for the West Michigan Whitecaps, was limited to only 53 games due to injury. Hill returned to West Michigan in 2016 where he improved, posting a .266 average with one home run, 31 RBIs, and 35 stolen bases. In 2017, Hill began the season with West Michigan, and after batting .285 with an .812 OPS, he was promoted to the Lakeland Flying Tigers in late August. He played in only nine games for them in which he batted .194.

Hill was added to the Tigers 40–man roster following the 2019 season. On September 2, 2020, Hill was recalled by the Tigers following a season-ending injury to JaCoby Jones. He made his MLB debut on September 4, 2020 as a defensive replacement. He batted .091 with no home runs or RBI in 15 games for the Tigers in 2020.

Hill began the 2021 season at the Tigers alternate training site in Toledo, and was assigned to the AAA Toledo Mud Hens in May. On June 3, Hill was recalled to the major league club following an injury to Victor Reyes. On August 8, Hill hit his first major league home run, a three-run drive to left-center off Zach Plesac of the Cleveland Indians. On August 11, Hill was placed on the 10-day injured list after suffering a left ribcage contusion in a collision with left fielder Akil Baddoo the previous night. In 49 games with the 2021 Tigers, Hill hit .259 with 3 home runs, 14 RBIs, and 6 stolen bases. He had the 3rd-fastest sprint speed of all major leaguers, at 30.5 feet/second.

On April 6, 2022, the Tigers announced Hill would start the 2022 season on the 10-day injured list (retroactive to April 4) with a right hamstring strain. On August 1, 2022, Hill was designated for assignment by the Tigers.

Seattle Mariners
On August 5, 2022, Hill was claimed off waivers from the Tigers by the Seattle Mariners. Hill was assigned to the AAA Tacoma Rainiers. On October 26, Hill was designated for assignment. He elected free agency on November 10, 2022.

Washington Nationals
On November 14, 2022, Hill signed a minor league deal with the Washington Nationals.

Personal life
Hill's father, Orsino Hill, is a scout for the Los Angeles Dodgers.

References

External links

1995 births
Living people
African-American baseball players
Baseball players from Sacramento, California
Baseball players from Des Moines, Iowa
Connecticut Tigers players
Detroit Tigers players
Erie SeaWolves players
Gulf Coast Tigers players
Lakeland Flying Tigers players
Major League Baseball outfielders
Mesa Solar Sox players
Tacoma Rainiers players
Toledo Mud Hens players
West Michigan Whitecaps players